The men's individual all-around competition was one of eight events for male competitors in artistic gymnastics at the 1992 Summer Olympics in Barcelona. The qualification and final rounds took place on July 29 and 31 at the Palau dels Esports de Barcelona. There were 93 competitors from 25 nations. Each nation could enter a team of 6 gymnasts or up to 3 individual gymnasts. The event was won by Vitaly Scherbo, one of his six gold medals in 1992. The Unified Team, making its only Summer Olympics appearance, swept the medals, with Scherbo taking gold, Grigory Misutin silver, and Valery Belenky bronze. It was the second consecutive medal sweep in the event (the Soviet Union had done it in 1988) and fourth overall (France in 1900, Japan in 1972).

Background

This was the 21st appearance of the men's individual all-around. The first individual all-around competition had been held in 1900, after the 1896 competitions featured only individual apparatus events. A men's individual all-around has been held every Games since 1900.

Five of the top 11 gymnasts (including a tie for tenth place) from the 1988 Games returned: fourth-place finisher Sven Tippelt of East Germany (now competing for unified Germany), fifth-place finisher Marius Gherman of Romania, sixth-place finisher Kalofer Khristozov of Bulgaria, eighth-place finisher Yukio Iketani of Japan, and tenth-place finisher Sylvio Kroll of East Germany (now Germany). The reigning (1991) World Champion was Grigory Misutin of the Soviet Union/Unified Team, with his teammate Vitaly Scherbo second. The 1989 World Champion (and 1992 European champion) Igor Korobchinsky, also of the Soviet Union/Unified Team, also competed in Barcelona.

Puerto Rico and Slovenia each made their debut in the event. Some former Soviet republics competed together as the Unified Team. France made its 19th appearance, most among nations.

Competition format

In the first major format change since 1976 (when the number of gymnasts per nation in the final was limited to three), the 1992 Games ended the carryover of preliminary scores to the final. The preliminary round and final round were now separate. In the preliminary round (which also served as the team all-around competition as well as the qualifying round for the individual apparatus events), each gymnast performed a compulsory exercise and an optional exercise on each apparatus. The scores for all 12 exercises were summed to give an individual all-around preliminary score. The top 36 gymnasts advanced to the individual all-around final—except that each nation was limited to 3 finalists. There, each of the finalists performed another exercise on each apparatus. The sum of these six exercise scores resulted in a final total.

Each exercise was scored from 0 to 10; thus, the preliminary apparatus scores ranged from 0 to 20 each and the total preliminary score from 0 to 120. The final total, with six exercises, was from 0 to 60.

The preliminary exercise scores were also used for qualification for the apparatus finals.

Schedule

All times are Central European Summer Time (UTC+2)

Results

Eighty-nine gymnasts competed in the all-around during the compulsory and optional rounds on July 29. The thirty-six highest scoring gymnasts advanced to the final on July 31. Each country was limited to three competitors in the final.

References

External links
Official Olympic Report
www.gymnasticsresults.com

Men's individual all-around
Men's events at the 1992 Summer Olympics